The Champions Chess Tour 2021, known for sponsorship reasons as the Meltwater Champions Chess Tour, was a 10-month long series of 10 online chess tournaments featuring the world's top players, playing for a prize money pool of US$1.5 million. The tournament games are held on chess24.com and are broadcast on Twitch, YouTube, chess24.com itself, and the tour's official website. The tour started on November 22, 2020, and lasted until October 4, 2021. The tournaments were not rated by FIDE.

Format 
There are 10 total tournaments in the tour: 6 labelled as Regular, 3 labelled as Major, and 1 Final. Each takes place towards the end of a month over the course of 9 days.

Qualification 
According to the tour regulations, there are 16 spots in a Regular tournament, 12 spots in a Major tournament, and 10 spots in the Final tournament. However, after the first Major tournament (Airthings Masters), it was concluded that 8 out of 12 players advancing to the knockout round rewarded cautious play, and the remaining Major tournaments (Magnus Carlsen Invitational and FTX Crypto Cup) were conducted with 16 players.

For each of the Regular tournaments except for the first one, 8 of the 16 spots are given to the current top 8 players in the Tour Rankings. The rest of the spots are given out via wild cards, invitations, or popular votes. The 16 spots for the first tournament of the tour are chosen via the decision of the event organizers.

For the Major tournaments, 8 of the spots are also given to the current top 8 players in the Tour Rankings. The winner of the preceding Regular tournament is also given a spot, if he or she is not already in the top 8. The rest of the spots are given via wild cards.

For the Final tournament, 8 of the 10 spots are given first to the winners of the 3 Major tournaments, then down the standings of the Tour Rankings. The final 2 spots are given to the best-performing "Tour Ambassadors."

Schedule

Time controls 

Three different time controls are used in the tour:

 In rapid games, each player has 15 minutes, plus a 10-second increment for each move.
 In blitz games, each player has 5 minutes, plus a 3-second increment for each move.
 In Armageddon games, white has 5 minutes, black has 4 minutes, there is no increment, and black wins the tie in case of a draw.

Tournament formats

Regular 
The Regular tournaments consist of a preliminary round and 3 knockout rounds. In the preliminary round, the 16 players participate in a round-robin spanning 3 days (5 games per day), with each player playing the other players for 1 rapid game, for a total of 120 games. The top 8 players with the most points advance to the next round and are seeded for the purposes of making the bracket based on their points. In the event that 2 or more players are tied with points, the following system is used:
 Points won in matches involving the tied players
 Number of wins
 Sonneborn–Berger score
 Koya score

In the knockout rounds, each matchup consists of 2 matches of 4 rapid games on back-to-back days. If either player wins one match and at least draws the other, he advances on to the next round. If each player wins one match or both matches are drawn, immediately following the second match, the players play 2 blitz games. If the blitz games are split, the winner is determined via an Armageddon game. The higher seed in each matchup picks the color for the first game, the first tiebreaker, and the Armageddon. In addition to the games between players who advanced, there is also a match for third place between the semifinal losers.

Major 
The Major tournaments operate the same way as the Regular tournaments. It is still the top 8 players who qualify for the knockout rounds.

Final 
The Final only consists of one round-robin for the 10 players, spanning 9 days (1 matchup per day). Each matchup will comprise 4 rapid games. If the 4 points are split among the two players, then 2 blitz games are played, followed by Armageddon if the blitz games are split. 3 points are awarded for an outright win (no tiebreak needed), 2 points are awarded for a tiebreak win, and 1 point is awarded for a tiebreak loss.

In addition to these points, the players start off with bonus points based on their Tour rankings coming into the Final. The player with the fewest Tour points gets 0 bonus points, and the other players are awarded half a point for every full 10 points they have more than the player with the least number. For example, if Player A has the fewest Tour points with 86, a Player B with 143 Tour points will be awarded 2.5 points, since they exceed Player A's total by 57 (no rounding).

The player with the greatest sum of bonus points and points won in the Final will be crowned the Tour Champion.

Tour points 
For Regular tournaments, points are awarded as follows.

In other words, a player receives 10 points for winning in the quarterfinals, 15 points for winning in the semifinals, 15 points for winning the final and 5 points for winning the match for third place. The regulations were present for most of the tournament, excluding the Skilling Open tournament; in that tournament of the tour, the runner-up was awarded 20 points and the two remaining semi-finalists were each awarded 10 points, without a match for 3rd place.

Additional points are also awarded to finishes in the preliminary round:

The points system for Major tournaments is the same, but all values are doubled.

In the event that two players are tied for the same number of Tour points, the following tiebreak system will be used:
 Number of tournament wins
 Number of tournament appearances (fewer is better)
 Number of final appearances
 Number of semi-final appearances
 Number of quarter-final appearances

The administrators of the tournament also have the right to substitute a tiebreak match if the tie is for a qualification spot.

Prize money

Regular 
The total prize pool for a Regular tournament is $100,000. The money is split as follows:

The regulations were changed after the Skilling Open tournament; in this first tournament of the tour, the players who lost in the semifinals each received $7,500, without a match for 3rd place.

Major 
The total prize pool for a Major tournament is $200,000. The money is split as follows:

Final 
The prize pool for the final is $300,000, which is split as follows:

Results

Tournament results

Tour rankings 
The column labelled "Wins" indicates the number of tournament wins.

The column labelled "Apps" indicates the number of tournament appearances (including the ongoing tournament, if any).

The winners of the Major tournaments are invited to the Final tournament, as are the 5 players (or more if one player has won more than one Major) with the highest tour ranking among the remaining players. Two additional players are invited as wild cards. As the winners of the Major tournaments (Teimour Radjabov, Anish Giri and Magnus Carlsen) are guaranteed a place in the Final. An asterisk denotes a Major.

Tournaments

Skilling Open 

The results of the preliminary round were as follows.

The results of the knockout rounds were as follows.

* This player advanced by drawing as black in an Armageddon game.

Airthings Masters

The results of the preliminary round were as follows.

The results of the knockout rounds were as follows.

* This player advanced by drawing as black in an Armageddon game.

Opera Euro Rapid

FTX Crypto Cup

Goldmoney Asian Rapid

Chessable Masters

Aimchess US Rapid

Tour Final
Teimour Radjabov, Anish Giri and Magnus Carlsen qualified by winning a Major tournament, while Wesley So, Levon Aronian, Hikaru Nakamura and Vladislav Artemiev qualified for the finals via the tour standings. Maxime Vachier-Lagrave replaced Ian Nepomniachtchi, while Shakhriyar Mamedyarov and Jan-Krzysztof Duda got a wildcard spot. Every player, except for Duda, starts with extra points according to their Tour standings.

Qualifiers

Chessable Qualifier
Chessable Qualifier was held from 17 to 18 October 2020, and was a qualification tournament for Skilling Open, the first event of the Champions Chess Tour.

Magnus Carlsen Invitational Qualifier

Julius Baer Challengers Chess Tour

Coverage 
Chess24.com provided free live coverage of every tournament, with commentary in 10 different languages. They were broadcasting on their website, on the official tour website, and on Twitch. Various other chess streamers also provided live commentary.

Sponsorship 
Julius Baer and Opera were two listed sponsors of the event. Skilling sponsored the first tournament, while Airthings sponsored the second tournament.  Cryptocurrency Company FTX sponsored the FTX Crypto Cup, providing 2.18 Bitcoin in the prize fund, worth $100,000 at the time of purchase. The Tour was also funded by offering Premium and VIP Tour Passes, services that offered perks such as voting on the wild cards, memberships for Chess24.com, and interaction opportunities with top chess players.

On January 3, 2021, Meltwater was announced as the title partner for the tour, which was accordingly renamed the Meltwater Champions Chess Tour.

References

Notes

External links 
 Official website of the Champions Chess Tour 2021

Chess competitions
2020 in chess
2021 in chess